Gao Zhidan (born January 1963) is a Chinese politician who is the current director of the State General Administration of Sports, in office since July 2022.

Biography
Gao was born in Siping, Jilin, in January 1963. After graduating from Beijing Sport University in 1988, he was assigned to the State General Administration of Sports. He moved up the ranks to become assistant director in May 2015 and deputy director in June 2016. On 29 July 2022, he rose to become director, succeeding Gou Zhongwen.

References

1963 births
Living people
People from Siping
Beijing Sport University alumni
People's Republic of China politicians from Jilin
Chinese Communist Party politicians from Jilin
Members of the 20th Central Committee of the Chinese Communist Party